Grand Boulevard may refer to:

Grand Boulevard (Budapest), Hungary
Grand Boulevard, Joondalup, Australia
Grand Boulevard (Montreal), Canada

United States
Grand Boulevard (Corona), California, a circular street that encircles downtown Corona
Grand Boulevard, Chicago, Illinois, a neighborhood
Grand Boulevard (Detroit), Michigan, a boulevard that encircles central Detroit
Grand Boulevard (Kansas City, Missouri)
Grand Boulevard, Long Beach, New York
Grand Boulevard (St. Louis), Missouri
Grand Boulevard (Oklahoma City), Oklahoma
Southern Parkway (Louisville, Kentucky), formerly called Grand Boulevard

See also
Grand Avenue (disambiguation)
Grand Street (disambiguation)